This is the list of Croatian Righteous Among the Nations. , 117 Croatians have been honored with this title by Yad Vashem for saving Jews during World War II.

One of the Righteous, Sister Amadeja Pavlović (28 January 1895 – 26 November 1971), was the Superior of the Croatian province of the Sisters of Mercy of the Holy Cross in Đakovo from 1943–55. She rescued Zdenka Grunbaum, then a ten-year-old girl from Osijek; Grunbaum's family was killed in Đakovo. Grunbaum later moved to America, and started the initiative to have Pavlović recognized as Righteous Among the Nations. Pavlović was recognized as Righteous Among the Nations by Yad Vashem in 2008; Croatian president Stjepan Mesić attended the ceremony.

List
 
 Bauer, Čedomir and Bauer, Branko (Zagreb)
 Beritić, Tihomil and Zina-Gertruda (Zagreb)
 Dolinar, Žarko and Boris
 Kalogjera, Jakša - Ing. Who saved life of Lili Moravetz
 Ujević, Mate - Lexicographer who compiled the Croatian Encyclopedia (1938–1945) 
 Vranetić, Ivan (Topusko)
 Rudimir Rudolf Roter (Potomje) - First Croatian journalist and among the first European journalists awarded with this honour

References

External links
List of Croatian Righteous at Yad Vashem website
 Yad Vashem Righteous Among The Nations database
In Croatian:
 Projekt pravednici među narodima
 Pravednici među narodima 2005
 Heroji iz našeg susjedstva

 
Righteous Among the Nations
Righteous Among the Nations
Righteous Among the Nations
Croatian